The term Beta movement is used for the optical illusion of apparent motion in which the very short projection of one figure and a subsequent very short projection of a more or less similar figure in a different location are experienced as one figure that moves. 

The illusion of motion caused by animation and film is sometimes believed to rely on beta movement, as an alternative to the older explanation known as persistence of vision. However, there are notable differences between the short-range apparent motion that occurs in film (with little differences between successive images) and the long-range apparent motion originally described as beta movement (with bigger differences between positions of successive images).

Examples of use

The beta movement effect has been widely used in news ticker technology and is commonly seen in LED displays.

History
Observations of apparent motion through quick succession of images go back to the 19th century. In 1833, Joseph Plateau introduced what became known as the phenakistiscope, an early animation device based on a stroboscopic effect. It was often assumed that the animation effect was due to persistence of vision in the form of afterimages on the retina or a mental process that filled in the intervals between the images.

In 1875, Sigmund Exner showed that, under the right conditions, people will see two quick, spatially separated but stationary electrical sparks as a single light moving from place to place, while quicker flashes were interpreted as motion between two stationary lights. Exner argued that the impression of the moving light was a perception (from a mental process) and the motion between the stationary lights as pure sense.

In 1912, Max Wertheimer wrote an influential article that would lead to the foundation of Gestalt psychology. In the discussed experiments, he asked test subjects what they saw when viewing successive tachistoscope projections of two similar shapes at two alternating locations on a screen. The results differed depending on the frequency of the flashes of the tachistoscope. At low frequencies, successive appearances of similar figures at different spots were perceived. At medium frequencies, it seemed like one figure moved from one position to the following position, regarded as "optimale Bewegung" (optimal motion) by Wertheimer. No shape was seen in between the two locations. At higher speeds, when test subjects believed to see both of the fast blinking figures more or less simultaneously, a moving objectless phenomenon was seen between and around the projected figures. Wertheimer used the Greek letter φ (phi) to designate illusions of motion and thought of the high-frequency objectless illusion as a "pure phi phenomenon", which he supposed was a more direct sensory experience of motion. Wertheimer's work became famous due to his demonstrations of the phi phenomenon, while the optimal motion illusion was regarded as the phenomenon well-known from movies.

In 1913, Friedrich Kenkel defined different types of the motion illusions found in the experiments of Wertheimer and subsequent experiments by Kurt Koffka (who had been one of Wertheimer's test subjects). Kenkel, a co-worker of Koffka, gave the optimal illusion of motion (with the appearance of one figure moving from one place to the next) the designation "β-Bewegung" (beta movement).

Confusion about phi phenomenon and beta movement

Wertheimer's pure phi phenomenon and beta movement are often confused in explanations of film and animation, but they are quite different perceptually and neither really explains the short-range apparent motion seen in film. 

There are many factors that determine whether one will experience beta movement or the phi phenomenon in a particular circumstance. They include the luminance of the stimuli in contrast to the background, the size of the stimuli, how far apart they are, how long each one is displayed, and precisely how much time passes between them (or the extent to which they overlap in time).

References

Optical illusions